Stratocumulus castellanus or Stratocumulus castellatus is a type of stratocumulus cloud, castellanus is derived from Latin, meaning 'of a castle' This type of cloud appears as cumuliform turrets vertically rising from a common horizontal cloud base, these turrets are taller than they are wide

This type of cloud indicates an increasingly unstable atmosphere, and seeing this type of cloud in the morning usually means that there is a possibility of thunderstorms forming later in the afternoon
In the right conditions, these clouds can grow into cumulus congestus clouds, and sometimes, into cumulonimbus clouds

References 

Cumulus

Clouds